Bill Granger (June 1, 1941 – April 22, 2012) was an American novelist from Chicago specializing in political thrillers.
He also wrote under the pseudonyms Joe Gash and Bill Griffith. He worked at the Chicago Tribune and other Illinois newspapers.

Some of his thrillers are Public Murders (1981), The November Man, Schism and The Shattered Eye.

Early years
Born June 1, 1941, in Wisconsin Rapids, Wisconsin, William F. Granger lived most of his life in Chicago, on the city's South Side. He attended St. Ambrose Catholic School until 1955. Next, Granger attended DePaul University, where he was a student newspaper editor of The DePaulia. He graduated with a bachelor's degree in English in 1963. During his student years he was a copy boy with The Washington Post, where he met his wife Lori.

Military service and writing career

From 1963 to 1965, Granger served with the United States Army before his writing career that span from the 1960s to 2000 with several Chicago newspapers:

 1963-1966 Reporter with United Press International Chicago bureau
 1966-1969 Reporter with Chicago Tribune
 1969 Began teaching journalism classes at Columbia College, Chicago
 1969-1978 Reporter and columnist with Chicago Sun Times
 1971 6-month leave from Sun Times to Europe and later covering Belfast civil war for Newsday, The Washington Post, and the Los Angeles Times news service
 1972-1974 Returns and becomes suburban feature writer with Sun Times
 1975-1977 Radio-television critic columnist with the Sun Times
 1980 Contributing columnist with Chicago Tribune
 1994-1999 Columnist with Daily Herald

Novels
 1979 The November Man
 1980 Sweeps
 1981 Schism
 1981 Public Murders (Edgar Award winner) 
 1982 Queen's Crossing
 1982 The Shattered Eye
 1982 Time for Frankie Coolin (as Bill Griffith)
 1983 The British Cross
 1984 The Zurich Numbers
 1986 Hemingway's Notebook
 1987 There Are No Spies
 1988 The Infant Of Prague
 1988 Henry McGee Is Not Dead
 1990 The Man Who Heard Too Much
 1990 League Of Terror
 1991 Drover
 1991 The Last Good German
 1992 Drover and the Zebras
 1993 Burning The Apostle
 1994 Drover and the Designated Hitter

Later years and death
Granger had a stroke in January 2000, and ended his writing career. From 2002 to his death he lived in the Manteno Veterans Home; the immediate cause of death was a heart attack, although he had suffered a series of strokes since the 1990s. He is survived by wife Lori and son Alec.

In 2001, Lori Granger gave the DePaul University Special Collections and Archives a collection of documents and correspondence, including personal documents, photographs, and childhood items, related to her husband's career as a journalist and novelist.

References

1941 births
2012 deaths
American male writers
DePaul University alumni
Chicago Sun-Times people
DePaul University Special Collections and Archives holdings
People from Manteno, Illinois